John Charles Brindley (29 January 1947 – 6 April 2007) was an English footballer active in the 1960s and 1970s. A full-back, he made a total of 247 appearances in the Football League for Nottingham Forest, Notts County and Gillingham. He played non-league football for Grantham, Burton Albion and Alfreton Town. He later managed Boston, Meadows Albion, Heanor Town, Ilkeston Town and Arnold Town.

References

1947 births
2007 deaths
English footballers
Footballers from Nottingham
Association football fullbacks
English Football League players
Gillingham F.C. players
Nottingham Forest F.C. players
Notts County F.C. players
Alfreton Town F.C. players
Burton Albion F.C. players
Grantham Town F.C. players
English football managers
Boston Town F.C. managers